Rebecca Buffum Spring (June 8, 18111911) was a Quaker abolitionist, educational reformer, feminist, and women's suffrage activist. She was born in Providence, Rhode Island, fourth daughter of Arnold Buffum (1782-1859), who with William Lloyd Garrison founded the New England Anti-Slavery Society, of which he was the first president.  Elizabeth ended her education at the age of 16 and became a teacher in an infant school at the request of her father.   Elizabeth Buffum Chace was her sister. She was co-founder in 1836 of the Fall River Female Anti-Slavery Society.

She married Marcus Spring (1810-1874), a philanthropic New York businessman, in approximately 1840. She and her husband were long-time friends of Fredrika Bremer, Lydia Maria Child, Margaret Fuller, and Elizabeth Palmer Peabody.

She has been criticized, but also defended, for seeing motherhood as a fundamental role of women, and linking abolitionism with the maternal.

Lydia Maria Child wrote John Brown while he was in jail in Virginia in 1859, asking if she could visit and nurse him; he declined. Rebecca did not ask; she traveled to Charles Town, Virginia, to meet with Brown and offer what consolation she could, and after delay, was allowed to meet with him twice. In her published description of her visits, she implied that there was something holy, even Biblical, in his person, and that he deserved her veneration.f

During the American Civil War, Spring and her husband supported a Virginia-based school for slave children. They also financed a soup kitchen to aid the increasing number of fugitives and refugees traveling north in the wake of the Emancipation Proclamation of 1863.

She and her husband were instrumental in the founding of two intentional communities based on the teachings of Charles Fourier: the North American Phalanx (1843), in  Red Bank, New Jersey, and then, unhappy with the direction it was taking, the Raritan Bay Union (1853) in Perth Amboy, New Jersey. the latter of which was located on his estate in Eagleswood, New Jersey. The Union sponsored a coed and "racially" integrated boarding school. Theodore Weld was its director, and the Grimké sisters were teachers.  In the late 1850s Spring founded the Eagleswood Military Academy. She had two of John Brown's executed raiders, who lacked family to bury them. buried there. In the late 1890s, impoverished, she moved to Southern California to live with her daughter Jeanie Peet, where she became involved with many of the local artists and writers.

Writings by Rebecca Buffum Spring
   A different version was published in the New York Tribune, December 2, 1859, p. 6.

Writings about Rebecca Buffum Spring (most recent first)

Archival material
The Rebecca Spring papers were purchased by the Stanford University Library. There is a published guide. Minser discusses the collection.

References

1811 births
1911 deaths
American feminists
American abolitionists
American centenarians
Women centenarians
19th-century Quakers
American Quakers
Quaker feminists
People from Providence, Rhode Island
People from Perth Amboy, New Jersey
Motherhood
Founders of utopian communities
John Brown's raid on Harpers Ferry